The 1951–52 English National League season was the 11th season of the English National League, the top level ice hockey league in England. Six teams participated in the league, and the Wembley Lions won the championship.

Regular season

External links
 Nottingham Panthers history site

Eng
Engl
Engl
English National League seasons
1951–52 in British ice hockey